The European Solar Physics Division (ESPD) of the European Physical Society (EPS), is an organisation whose purpose is to promote solar physics and represent European scientists interested in the physics of the Sun. The ESPD is known mostly for its organisation of the European Solar Physics Meetings, which bring together European solar physicists and take place every three years. 

Since 2017, the ESPD awards three prizes: the Senior Prize for outstanding contributions over an extended period of time to solar physics, the Early Career Prize for outstanding contributions to solar physics from an Early career researcher, and the PhD Prize for the best European PhD thesis in solar physics.

History

In 1974, solar physicists in Europe recognised the need for common meetings and the "European Solar Meeting Organising Committee" was created, with the first European Solar Physics Meeting organised in 1975. This meeting was attended by more than 200 solar physicists (a remarkable number for the time), and during the meeting it was decided to proceed with the creation of a Solar Physics Section (SPS) as part of the Astronomy and Astrophysics Division of the EPS.

In 1990, the European Astronomical Society (EAS) was founded, and the SPS became a section of the Joint Astrophysics Division (JAD) of EPS and EAS. In 2009 the SPS became the European Solar Physics Division, an EPS division in its own right.

Meetings

The ESPD organises the European Solar Physics Meeting (ESPM), the largest meeting of solar physics in Europe. They are held every three years. The following European Solar Physics Meetings have taken place:
 1975: ESPM-1, Florence, Italy
 1978: ESPM-2, Toulouse, France
 1981: ESPM-3, Oxford, United Kingdom
 1984: ESPM-4, Noordwijkerhout, Netherlands
 1987: ESPM-5, Titisee, Germany
 1990: ESPM-6, Debrecen, Hungary
 1993: ESPM-7, Catania, Italy
 1996: ESPM-8, Thessaloniki, Greece
 1999: ESPM-9, Florence, Italy
 2002: ESPM-10, Prague, Czech Republic
 2005: ESPM-11, Leuven, Belgium
 2008: ESPM-12, Freiburg, Germany
 2011: ESPM-13, Rhodes, Greece
 2014: ESPM-14, Dublin, Ireland
 2017: ESPM-15, Budapest, Hungary
 2021: ESPM-16, virtual conference

Besides the European Solar Physics Meeting, the ESPD has also been associated with the organisation of the China–Europe Solar Physics Meeting. The following meetings have taken place:

 2016: 1st China–Europe Solar Physics Meeting, Kunming, China
 2018: 2nd China-Europe Solar Physics Meeting, Hvar, Croatia

See also
 List of astronomical societies

References

External links
 ESPM-14
 ESPM-15
 ESPM-16
 1st China–Europe Solar Physics Meeting
 2nd China–Europe Solar Physics Meeting

Astronomy in Europe
Astronomy organizations 
Pan-European scientific societies
Physics organizations